"Night Games" is a song written by Blake Mevis and Norro Wilson, and recorded by American country music artist Charley Pride. It was released in May 1983 as the first single and title track from the album Night Games. Pride's 29th and final number one hit on the Billboard country music charts, the single peaked at number one for one week and spent a total of 13 weeks on the country chart. It was the last country song by a solo black artist to reach number one on the country charts until "Don't Think I Don't Think About It" by Darius Rucker achieved the feat in 2008.

Charts

Weekly charts

Year-end charts

References

1983 singles
1983 songs
Ray Stevens songs
Charley Pride songs
Songs written by Norro Wilson
Song recordings produced by Norro Wilson
RCA Records singles
Songs written by Blake Mevis